"Tell It Like It Is" is a song written by George Davis and Lee Diamond and originally recorded and released in 1966 by Aaron Neville. In 2010, the song was ranked No. 391 on Rolling Stone magazine's list of The 500 Greatest Songs of All Time.

Aaron Neville version
In 1966, Aaron Neville recorded and released the original version of "Tell It Like It Is" on his album also entitled Tell It Like It Is (Par-Lo Records). In November 1966, the track was issued as a single which peaked in early 1967 at No. 2 on the US Billboard Hot 100 (behind "I'm a Believer" by the Monkees) and No. 1 on the US Hot R&B/Hip-Hop Songs chart. The personnel on the original recording included George Davis arranging and playing baritone saxophone, Emory Humphrey-Thompson (Umar Shariff) on trumpet, Deacon John on guitar, Alvin "Red" Tyler on tenor saxophone, Willie Tee on piano and June Gardner on drums.

Andy Williams version
His 1975 version touched the top 50 in the Canadian country charts, and was #16 in the AC charts.

John Wesley Ryles version

In 1976, American Country singer John Wesley Ryles covered the song for his 1977 self-titled album, which also included a cover of When a Man Loves a Woman. Ryles's version became a minor hit, reaching Number 83 on the Billboard Hot Country Songs chart.

Heart version

Heart covered "Tell It Like It Is" in 1980.  It was a studio recording included on their Greatest Hits/Live album. It was the first of two singles released from the album, the other one a live recording but both of them cover hits. The song peaked at Number 8 on the Billboard Hot 100 during the winter of 1981 and became their highest-charting single in the United States to that point. It had higher success in Canada, reaching Number 4.

Record World commented that Ann Wilson's "sensitive vocal" gives the song "a woman's point of view" and that Nancy Wilson "adds hot guitar passion."

Billy Joe Royal version

In 1988, American country soul singer Billy Joe Royal recorded a cover for His seventh studio album of the same name. Royal's version was released in January 1989 and reached Number 2 both on the Billboard Hot Country Songs and Canada Country charts respectively.

Don Johnson version

Also in 1989, American actor and singer Don Johnson covered the song for his second studio album Let It Roll. Johnson's version was successful in Europe, especially in Germany, reaching Number 2 there.

References

External links 

 
 

1966 singles
1976 singles
1980 singles
1989 singles
Aaron Neville songs
Otis Redding songs
Percy Sledge songs
Nina Simone songs
Freddy Fender songs
John Wesley Ryles songs
Andy Williams songs
Heart (band) songs
Billy Joe Royal songs
Gene Summers songs
Epic Records singles
Atlantic Records singles
1966 songs
1960s ballads